Masoud bin Mohammed Al Ameri is the Qatari Minister of Justice. He was appointed as minister on 17 June 2021.

Education 
Ameri holds a Bachelor of Laws from the Cairo University and a Master of Laws in International Legal Studies from Washington College of Law.

Career 
From 1983 until 1986, Al Ameri served as a judicial assistant in courts.

Between 1986 and 1997, he served as a judge. In March 1997, Al Ameri was nominated as a judge for the International Criminal Tribunal for the Former Yugoslavia. In addition, Al Ameri was appointed vice president of the Court of Appeal in 1997.

In 2002, Al Ameri worked for the Public Prosecution Office of Qatar. From 2003 until 2008, he was the Attorney-General and Director of the Judicial Inspection Department.

Between 2008 and 2021, he served as the President of the Court of Cassation and the Supreme Judicial Council. In addition, he was appointed advisor at the office of the Deputy Amir in 2018.

Since 2021, Al Ameri has served as Minister of Justice.

References 

Living people
21st-century Qatari politicians
Qatari politicians
Government ministers of Qatar
Year of birth missing (living people)

Washington College of Law alumni